The Balkan Athletics Championships is a regional athletics competition held between nations from the Balkans and organized by Balkan Athletics. The first games were held in Athens in 1929 as an unofficial event, receiving official sanction the following year.

The competition was not held from 1941 to 1952, although an unofficial Balkan Games was held in 1946 and a Balkan and Central European Games in 1947, involving the same countries plus Hungary. The first women's champions were declared at those events, and a women's programme continued upon the official post-World War II relaunch in 1953.

Champions

100 metres

200 metres

400 metres

800 metres

1500 metres

3000 metres
2001: 
2002: Not held
2003: 
2004: 
2005:

5000 metres

10,000 metres

Marathon

3000 metres steeplechase

110 metres hurdles

400 metres hurdles

High jump

Pole vault

Long jump

Triple jump

Shot put

Discus throw

Discus throw (Greek style)

Hammer throw

Javelin throw

Grenade throw
1946: 
1947:

Decathlon

20 kilometres walk
The distance for the 1979 Balkan Championships in 20 kilometres walk was mismeasured, resulting in a 20.9 km distance. The event has been held on roads, with the exception of the 1982, 1989, 1997 and 1998 races which took place on a track.

4 × 100 metres relay

4 × 400 metres relay
1929: 
1930: 
1931: 
1932: 
1933: 
1934: 
1935: 
1936: 
1937: 
1938: 
1939: 
1940: Not held
1946: 
1947: 
1953: 
1954: 
1955: 
1956: 
1957: 
1958: 
1959: 
1960: 
1961: 
1962: 
1963: 
1964: 
1965: 
1966: 
1967: 
1968: 
1969: 
1970: 
1971: 
1972: 
1973: 
1974: 
1975: 
1976: 
1977: 
1978: 
1979: 
1980: 
1981: 
1982: 
1983: 
1984: 
1985: 
1986: 
1988: 
1989: 
1990: 
1992: 
1994: 
1996: 
1997: 
1998: 
1999: 
2000: 
2001: 
2002: 
2003: 
2004: 
2005:

1600 metres Balkan medley relay
The initial event in 1929 was held over a longer distance.
1929: 
1930: 
1931: 
1932: 
1933: 
1934: 
1935: 
1936: 
1937: 
1938: 
1939: 
1940: 
1946: 
1947:

Partisans team walk
1946: 
1947:

References

Champions 1960–2006
Balkan Championships. GBR Athletics. Retrieved 2021-01-16.

Winners
 List
Balkan Championships
Balkan Championships